Oxygen (Dutch: Adem) is a 2010 Belgium/Netherlands co-production film directed by Hans Van Nuffel. It won Grand Prix des Amériques, the main prize at the Montreal World Film Festival.

References

External links
 

2010 films